The Desert Rose Band was an American country rock band from Los Angeles, California, founded in 1985 by Chris Hillman (formerly of the Byrds and the Flying Burrito Brothers), with Herb Pedersen and John Jorgenson. The original lineup included Bill Bryson on bass guitar, JayDee Maness on pedal steel guitar, and Steve Duncan on drums. In the late 1980s and early 1990s, the band charted several hit singles on the US Billboard Hot Country Singles & Tracks charts until disbanding in February 1994.

Formation
The Desert Rose Band was formed in 1985 by frontman Chris Hillman (born December 4, 1944), formerly a member of The Byrds, and co-founder, along with the late Gram Parsons of the country-rock band The Flying Burrito Brothers. Additional members included John Jorgenson (born July 6, 1956), who was mainly responsible for the instrumental arrangements of the songs, and Herb Pedersen (born April 27, 1944), responsible for the vocal arrangements. Jorgenson and Pedersen sang three-part harmony with Hillman. Each Desert Rose Band album featured Pedersen on one lead vocal. Pedal steel player JayDee Maness (born January 4, 1945), drummer Steve Duncan (born July 28, 1953), and bassist Bill Bryson (1946-2017) rounded out the group.

Career

1987-1989: The Desert Rose Band and Running
Their eponymous debut album was issued in 1987 on MCA/Curb. It contained their first hit "Ashes of Love", which was originally a Johnnie & Jack song from the early 1950s. It was the second time Hillman and Pedersen recorded "Ashes of Love," the first being on Hillman's just prior album Desert Rose on the Sugar Hill label. The Desert Rose Band's debut also featured a remake of Chris Hillman's "Time Between" which he previously wrote and recorded as a member of the Byrds, as well as the band's first chart-topper "He's Back and I'm Blue".

Their second album Running (1988) featured the John Hiatt-penned hit "She Don't Love Nobody", "Running", and a remake of Buck Owens's "Hello Trouble".

1990-1993: Pages of Life, True Love and Life Goes On
The third album Pages of Life (1990) featured a remake of "Desert Rose" as well as a remake of Pedersen's folk song about his daughter "Our Baby's Gone" which was originally recorded on his 1976 album Southwest. JayDee Maness left the band in 1990 and was replaced on pedal steel guitar by Tom Brumley whom Jay Dee replaced in the Buckaroos. Maness would again play with Chris Hillman and Herb Pedersen on their post Desert Rose Band duo albums Bakersfield Bound and Way Out West.

The fourth studio album, True Love, was released in 1991. It was followed by 1993's Life Goes On, released only in Europe. Several prominent country and bluegrass musicians made guest appearances on Life Goes On including Sam Bush on fiddle, Tony Rice and Larry Park (of Boy Howdy) on guitar, and Al Perkins on dobro. Before the release of this final studio album, was the 1993 compilation Traditional.

John Jorgenson and Steve Duncan left the band in 1991. Jorgenson went on to form the Hellecasters with Will Ray and Jerry Donahue; Duncan also joined the Hellecasters. John Jorgenson is currently playing gypsy jazz with his John Jorgenson Quintette. Chris and Herb recorded an acoustic album called The Other Side in 2005. They continue to tour as an acoustic duo. Former Buck Owens steel player Tom Brumley played with Joey Riley's band in Branson, Missouri. He died on February 3, 2009.

Awards
The Desert Rose Band was nominated for two Grammy Awards, in the category Best Country Performance by a Duo or Group with Vocal: the debut album The Desert Rose Band (1987), and the single "She Don't Love Nobody" (1989).

The band was a three-time winner of the Band of the Year/Touring Award presented by the Academy of Country Music Association, in 1988, 1989, and 1990.

The band earned the Country Music Association's "Horizon Award" in 1989, and was nominated Vocal Group of the Year in 1989 and 1990.

Broadcast Music Inc., recognized "One Step Forward" and "Love Reunited" for having achieved the benchmark of One Million Broadcast Radio Performances.

Discography

Studio albums

Compilation albums

Singles

Music videos

References

External links
CMT.com profile
chrishillman.com
herbpedersen.com
johnjorgenson.com
drb-fans.com

Country music groups from California
American country rock groups
MCA Records artists
Musical groups established in 1985
Musical groups disestablished in 1994
1985 establishments in California